TEDxMcGill is an independently organised single-day TED conference in Montreal started in 2009 by students from McGill University, after which the event is named.

History
The event was started by five students from the McGill University in 2009. Since then, TEDxMcGill has hosted annual conferences. The first conference gathered 16 speakers from different backgrounds (students, professors, analysts, musicians, and Andy Nulman, the co-founder of the Just for Laughs Comedy Festival) to initiate discussions on the theme of "Talks for Tomorrow".
Fifteen speakers and more than 600 people, including the McGill student body but also Montreal at large, met during the second conference themed "Relentless Curiosity" in 2010. The 2011 event was held on November 13 at Bain Mathieu. under the theme of Redefining Reality. The 2016 conference was held on March 19, 2016, following the theme Paradigm Shift. This was followed by the 2017 TEDxMcGill conference held at the McCord Museum in Montreal on November 11th 2017, under the theme of Giving Voice.The 2018 TEDxMcGill was also organised at the McCord Museum on November 24th, 2018, with the theme of "Climbing Ladders". The 2019 "Pushing the Envelope" TEDxMcGill event was also help at the McCord Museum on November 16th 2019. The last TEDxMcGill event was held remotely due to COVID-19 restrictions on the 31st of January 2021, and discussed the theme of "Embracing the Unknown". The latest TEDxMcGill event was held on November 13th, 2021, at l'Astral under the theme "Illuminate". The next event is planned for January 2023.

References

External links
 
 TED overview of the TEDx program

McGill University
McGill